The 1964 Sandown 6 Hour International was an endurance race for saloon cars complying with FIA Group 1 regulations. The event was held at the Sandown Park circuit in Victoria, Australia on 29 November 1964 and was the genesis of what is now known as the Sandown 500. The race was won by Roberto Bussinello and  Ralph Sachs, driving an Alfa Romeo Giulia TI Super.

Classes
Entries competed in seven classes as follows:
Class A : Over 3000cc
Class B : 2501-3000cc
Class C : 2001-2500cc
Class D : 1601-2000cc
Class E : 1301-1600cc
Class F : 900-1300cc
Class G : Open (ineligible for outright awards)

Class G was for entries which were modified to FIA Group 2 specifications.

Results

There were 37 starters in the race and 28 cars were classified as finishers.

References

Further reading
 Trevor Davis, Italy Successful in Six-Hour Saloon Car Race, The Age, Monday, 30 November 1964
 Official Programme, Sandown, Sunday, November 21, 1965

External links
 Youtube video

Motorsport at Sandown
Sandown 6 Hour International